"Honky-Tonk Girl" is a song co-written and originally recorded by Hank Thompson. Released by him on Capitol Records in 1954, it was a nationwide country hit in the United States that year (reaching country number nine on Billboard).

The song was notably covered by Johnny Cash.

Cash's version was released as a single by Columbia Records (Columbia 4-41707, with "Second Honeymoon" on the opposite side) in June or July 1960.

Composition 
The song evokes a barroom atmosphere.

Charts 
Johnny Cash version

References 

Hank Thompson (musician) songs
Johnny Cash songs
1954 singles
1960 singles
Songs written by Hank Thompson (musician)
Songs written by Chuck Harding
Capitol Records singles
Columbia Records singles
1954 songs